Gwinnett Place may refer to the following places in Gwinnett, the major suburban county of northeast metro Atlanta:

Gwinnett Place Mall
Gwinnett Place Community Improvement District, the community improvement district covering the Gwinnett Place business district which formed around the mall

See also
Gwinnett Place Transit Center, a bus station